I Do Perceive is the third album by the Chicago artist Mike Kinsella under the name Owen.  It was released on November 9, 2004, on Polyvinyl Records.

Track listing

References

External links
Owen's Webpage
I Do Perceive Review (punknews.org)
I Do Perceive Review (punkrocks.net)

2004 albums
Owen (musician) albums
Polyvinyl Record Co. albums